North Bend is a city in King County, Washington, United States, on the outskirts of the Seattle metropolitan area. The population was 7,461 at the 2020 census.

The town was made famous by David Lynch's television series Twin Peaks, which was partially filmed in North Bend. The community is also home to Nintendo North Bend, the main North American production facility and distribution center for the video game console manufacturer Nintendo.

History

The Snoqualmie Indian Tribe has resided in the Snoqualmie Prairie, including the area now known as North Bend, for thousands of years. This prairie southeast of Snoqualmie Falls  was the ancestral home, hunting and forage grounds for the Snoqualmie people and was located in the upper Snoqualmie Valley near the Snoqualmie River fork confluence, Mount Si, and the western foothills of the Cascade Range.

One of the first American explorers to the upper Snoqualmie Valley was Samuel Hancock who arrived in 1851. Hancock traveled upriver with his Snoqualmie guides, fording canoes around the falls to reach Snoqualmie Prairie, searching for coal deposits. He was taken to a "very extensive and fertile prairie" about two miles above Snoqualmie Falls. The beautiful open grassland came to be known as the Snoqualmie Prairie, the heart of which is now known as Tollgate and Meadowbrook farms. The Snoqualmies, led by Chief Patkanim, later sided with early settlers in the 1850s Indian Wars and were one of the signatory tribes of the Treaty of Point Elliott in 1855, which failed to designate an Indian reservation for the Snoqualmies. Some of the soldiers in those wars, such as the Kellogg brothers, established cabins near remaining Snoqualmie blockhouses; however, the most well known American resident in the valley was Jeremiah Borst, who arrived in 1858.

After the Homestead Act of 1862, more settlers ventured to the Snoqualmie Valley, with the first families settling near Borst on the easterly end of Snoqualmie Prairie. In 1865, Matts Peterson homesteaded the site that ultimately became North Bend. In 1879, Peterson sold the property to Borst and moved east of the Cascades. Borst wrote to Will Taylor, who had left the Pacific Northwest to pursue mining in California, and offered him the Peterson homestead in exchange for labor. Taylor returned and became the driving force in developing the town while expanding his property to include a thriving trading post and boarding house for travelers over Snoqualmie Pass. On February 16, 1889, with the upcoming railroad boom, Taylor formally platted a town including his farm, upcoming street plans and building lots, giving it the name "Snoqualmie Prairie". Later that summer, competing Seattle land speculators subsequently platted nearby "Snoqualmie Falls", choosing a similar name. Pressured by demands of the Seattle, Lake Shore and Eastern Railway to avoid confusion, Taylor reluctantly renamed his town "Mountain View". However, the U.S. Post Office Department objected to "Mountain View", as a town with that name already existed in northern Whatcom County. To conclude the matter Taylor agreed to permanently rename the community "North Bend", after its prime location near the large northward bend of the South and Middle Fork of the Snoqualmie River. Taylor was proud of his new, thriving town, but by historical accounts, "He never got over having his town name taken away." North Bend was officially incorporated on March 12, 1909, and grew throughout the 20th century, with an early economic focus on logging, sawmill production, agricultural and dairy farming.

Geography
North Bend is located near the geographic center of King County at  (47.493831, -121.786247).

The city is bordered to the northwest by the city of Snoqualmie. Both communities lie near the center of the Mountains to Sound Greenway. Mount Si, the most prominent geological feature nearby, looms over the town. To the south is Rattlesnake Ridge.

North Bend annexed some neighborhoods near Tanner and the Stilson area July 6, 2009.

Climate
North Bend's climate is warm and generally dry during the summer when high temperatures tend to be in the 70s and mild to cold during the winter when high temperatures tend to be in the 30s and 40s. The town's location in the foothills means that it receives significantly higher annual precipitation than other suburbs to the west, and also translates into heavier snowfall in the winter. The all-time record high temperature is  set during the 2021 Western North America heat wave. Winter months tend to be wetter than summer months.

Demographics

2010 census
As of the census of 2010, there were 5,731 people, 2,210 households, and 1,487 families residing in the city. The racial makeup of the city was 90.7% White, 0.5% African American, 0.9% Native American, 1.6% Asian, 0.1% Pacific Islander, 2.5% from other races, and 3.6% from two or more races. Hispanic or Latino of any race were 6.4% of the population.

There were 2,210 households, of which 39.0% had children under the age of 18 living with them, 52.9% were married couples living together, 10.0% had a female householder with no husband present, 4.4% had a male householder with no wife present, and 32.7% were non-families. 24.8% of all households were made up of individuals, and 9% had someone living alone who was 65 years of age or older. The average household size was 2.57 and the average family size was 3.10.

The median age in the city was 38.7 years. 26.8% of residents were under the age of 18; 6.8% were between the ages of 18 and 24; 27.6% were from 25 to 44; 29.4% were from 45 to 64; and 9.4% were 65 years of age or older. The gender makeup of the city was 49.3% male and 50.7% female.

2000 census
As of the census of 2000, there were 4,746 people, 1,841 households, and 1,286 families residing in the city. The population density was 1,611.6 people per square mile (623.3/km2). There were 1,889 housing units at an average density of 641.4 per square mile (248.1/km2). The racial makeup of the city was 92.01% White, 0.70% African American, 1.03% Native American, 2.23% Asian, 0.17% Pacific Islander, 1.45% from other races, and 2.40% from two or more races. Hispanic or Latino of any race were 3.79% of the population.

There were 1,841 households, out of which 37.8% had children under the age of 18 living with them, 57.1% were married couples living together, 8.8% had a female householder with no husband present, and 30.1% were non-families. 23.7% of all households were made up of individuals, and 10.8% had someone living alone who was 65 years of age or older. The average household size was 2.53 and the average family size was 3.01.

In the city the population was 27.3% under the age of 18, 6.7% from 18 to 24, 37.1% from 25 to 44, 18.4% from 45 to 64, and 10.6% who were 65 years of age or older. The median age was 34 years. For every 100 females, there were 97.5 males. For every 100 females age 18 and over, there were 94.0 males.

The median income for a household in the city was $61,534, and the median income for a family was $69,402. Males had a median income of $57,333 versus $38,401 for females. The per capita income for the city was $28,229. About 2.1% of families and 4.7% of the population were below the poverty line, including 5.1% of those under age 18 and 3.0% of those age 65 or over.

Culture

Historic McGrath Hotel
The McGrath Hotel is located on the site of the cabin of William Henry Taylor, who platted North Bend in 1889. In October 1921, Jack McGrath and his wife Caroline purchased the site of their future venture, McGrath's Café; construction was completed as a one-story restaurant in 1922. In early 1926 the building was expanded two window bays westward, creating the hotel lobby (now the restaurant bar), and a second story was added to the entire structure to accommodate the hotel rooms of the new McGrath Hotel. After several years of deferred maintenance, the McGrath was purchased in 2000 by a local couple who spent two years rehabilitating the building. It is now listed on the National Register of Historic Places. The first floor currently houses a popular restaurant, the Iron Duck Public House.

Historic North Bend Theatre
On April 9, 1941, the North Bend Theatre opened its doors. Built at a cost of $12,000 with 400 seats, the 4,000 square foot theater's occupancy is now 265 and it has continued operating as an independent movie theater since its opening day through seven family ownerships. In 1999, the theatre underwent a major renovation. In 2013, the theater was once more saved from extinction by a successful $100,000+ fundraiser to convert the projection system from 35mm cellulose to 4K digital video. During this series of renovations every part of the building was improved without sacrificing the distinctive character of this 1941 Art Deco theater. The renovation was awarded a Spellman Award, a King County honor, for the efforts.

The movie house hosted the opening premier of the David Lynch movie, Twin Peaks: Fire Walk With Me.

Valley Center Stage Community Theater
Valley Center Stage is a downtown community theater that promotes the performing arts in all its aspects. The theater has regular shows featuring classics and comedy. In addition, the theater offers opportunities to valley residents to participate in the theater's productions.

Snoqualmie Valley Historical Museum
The Snoqualmie Valley Historical Museum, operated by the Snoqualmie Valley Historical Society, has been sharing the history of the Snoqualmie Valley for over 50 years.

North Bend Visitor Center & Mountain View Art Gallery
The Visitors Information Center is operated by the North Bend Downtown Foundation and represents a significant step towards downtown revitalization and growing community pride through volunteer efforts. The Mountain View Gallery features local artwork and hosts special events for the community throughout the year. The modern Northwest Regional style center features easy to use touchscreen computers for visitors to access a variety of information on local attractions and history.

Transportation
There is regular bus service provided by King County Metro Transit on route 208. Metro buses are outfitted with bike racks. There are a number of van pools to Redmond, Bellevue, Seattle, and Renton. Snoqualmie Valley Transportation provides door-to-door transportation for the public in North Bend, Snoqualmie, Preston, Fall City, Carnation, Duvall and Monroe.

North Bend has a fairly modest trail system.  The Snoqualmie Valley Regional Trail stretches from Duvall through Carnation, Fall City, Snoqualmie, and North Bend to Rattlesnake Lake. This  trail connects to the Palouse to Cascades State Park Trail (which goes clear across Washington to the Idaho border) and to the city of Snoqualmie's extensive trail network. North Bend also has its own city trail system in downtown, the Si View neighborhood and along the South Fork of the Snoqualmie River in several places.

City park system
Outdoor recreation opportunities include hiking, fishing, mountain biking, climbing, river sports, wildlife observation, and enjoying scenic areas, all within city limits, not to mention the vast recreational playground immediately surrounding the city. Current city parks include Dahlgren Family Park, E.J. Roberts Park, Future Tennant Trailhead Park, Gardiner-Weeks Memorial Park, Meadowbrook Farm, Riverfront Park, Si View Neighborhood Park, Si View Park and Community Center, Snoqualmie Valley Trail, Tanner Trail, Tannerwood Neighborhood Park, Tollgate Farm, Tollgate Farm Park, Torguson Park and William Henry Taylor Park.

Gallery

Economy
Throughout the 20th century North Bend has maintained gradual growth with an early economic focus on logging, sawmill production, agricultural and dairy farming. Currently, North Bend is for the largest part a bedroom community to Bellevue and Seattle. In addition, North Bend has a growing tourism economy centered around the North Bend Premium Outlet Mall, Northwest Railway Museum train activities and Snoqualmie Pass recreational commerce related to hiking, backpacking, mountain biking, skiing, snowboarding and cross-country skiing. North Bend also has approximately 400 employees working for Nintendo North Bend.

Government and police

North Bend leans Democratic much like the rest of King County, giving a majority of the vote to Joe Biden in the 2020 presidential election.

Law enforcement services in North Bend have changed hands several times. From 1973 until March 8, 2014, the city contracted with the King County Sheriff's Office for law enforcement services within city limits. It was KCSO's longest standing contract at the time of its conclusion. Since March 8, 2014, the city has contracted for law enforcement services with the City of Snoqualmie Police Department.

Landmarks
King County and the city of North Bend have designated the following landmarks:

See also

 Alpine Lakes Wilderness
 Cascade Range
 Franklin Falls
 Interstate 90 in Washington
 Iron Horse State Park
 Little Si
 Mount Si
 Mount Washington (Cascades)
 Olallie State Park
 Rattlesnake Lake
 Rattlesnake Ridge
 Riverbend, Washington
 Snoqualmie Falls
 Snoqualmie Pass
 Snoqualmie River
 Tanner, Washington
 Twin Falls (Washington)
 Weeks Falls

References

External links

 City of North Bend official website
 Snoqualmie Valley Chamber of Commerce
 Snoqualmie School District
 North Bend Library
 North Bend Weather

Cities in King County, Washington
Cities in the Seattle metropolitan area
Cities in Washington (state)